Abraxas metamorpha is a species of moth belonging to the family Geometridae. It was described by Warren in 1893. It is known from Sikkim in India.

References

Abraxini
Moths of Asia
Moths described in 1893